Events from the year 2012 in Argentina

Incumbents
 President: Cristina Fernández de Kirchner
 Vicepresident: Amado Boudou

Governors
Governor of Buenos Aires Province: Daniel Scioli 
Governor of Catamarca Province: Lucía Corpacci 
Governor of Chaco Province: Juan Carlos Bacileff Ivanoff 
Governor of Chubut Province: Martín Buzzi 
Governor of Córdoba: José Manuel De la Sota 
Governor of Corrientes Province: Ricardo Colombi 
Governor of Entre Ríos Province: Sergio Urribarri 
Governor of Formosa Province: Gildo Insfrán
Governor of Jujuy Province: Eduardo Fellner 
Governor of La Pampa Province: Óscar Jorge 
Governor of La Rioja Province: Luis Beder Herrera 
Governor of Mendoza Province: Francisco Pérez 
Governor of Misiones Province: Maurice Closs 
Governor of Neuquén Province: Jorge Sapag 
Governor of Río Negro Province: Carlos Ernesto Soria (until 1 January); Alberto Weretilneck (starting 1 January)
Governor of Salta Province: Juan Manuel Urtubey 
Governor of San Juan Province: José Luis Gioja 
Governor of San Luis Province: Claudio Poggi 
Governor of Santa Cruz Province: Daniel Peralta 
Governor of Santa Fe Province: Antonio Bonfatti 
Governor of Santiago del Estero: Gerardo Zamora
Governor of Tierra del Fuego: Fabiana Ríos 
Governor of Tucumán: José Alperovich

Vice Governors
Vice Governor of Buenos Aires Province: Gabriel Mariotto 
Vice Governor of Catamarca Province: Dalmacio Mera 
Vice Governor of Chaco Province: Juan Carlos Bacileff Ivanoff 
Vice Governor of Corrientes Province: Pedro Braillard Poccard 
Vice Governor of Entre Rios Province: José Orlando Cáceres 
Vice Governor of Formosa Province: Floro Bogado 
Vice Governor of Jujuy Province: Guillermo Jenefes 
Vice Governor of La Pampa Province: Norma Durango 
Vice Governor of La Rioja Province: Sergio Casas 
Vice Governor of Misiones Province: Hugo Passalacqua 
Vice Governor of Neuquén Province: Ana Pechen 
Vice Governor of Rio Negro Province: Carlos Peralta 
Vice Governor of Salta Province: Andrés Zottos 
Vice Governor of San Juan Province: Sergio Uñac 
Vice Governor of San Luis Province: Jorge Raúl Díaz 
Vice Governor of Santa Cruz: Fernando Cotillo 
Vice Governor of Santa Fe Province: Jorge Henn 
Vice Governor of Santiago del Estero: Ángel Niccolai 
Vice Governor of Tierra del Fuego: Roberto Crocianelli

Events

January 2012
 January 1 -
 The Governor of Río Negro Carlos Soria dies in office.
 Alberto Weretilneck  becomes governor of Río Negro.

Deaths in 2012

January
 January 1
 Jorge Andrés Boero, 38, motorcycle racer, accident on the Dakar rally. (born 1973)
 Carlos Soria, 63, politician, Secretary of Intelligence (2002) and Governor of Río Negro (2011), shot. (born 1948)

February
 8 February- Luis Alberto Spinetta, 62, lung cancer.

April
 3 April - Eduardo Luis Duhalde

See also 
 List of Argentine films of 2012

References

External links
 

 
Years of the 21st century in Argentina
2010s in Argentina
Argentina
Argentina